Elizabeth "Betty" Sharp Adcock (born September 16, 1938) is an American poet and a 2002–2003 Guggenheim Fellow. Author of six poetry collections, she has served as a faculty member in the Warren Wilson College MFA Program for Writers in Asheville, North Carolina and in the Writer-in-Residence program at Meredith College in Raleigh, North Carolina. She has also held residencies at Lenoir-Rhyne College, Kalamazoo College, and Duke University, and has twice served as Visiting Distinguished Professor at North Carolina State University.

Life
The daughter of a landowner and a schoolteacher, Adcock grew up in San Augustine, Texas, a small farming community. The landscape of the area, a mix of West and Deep South, influenced her work. She moved to North Carolina after her marriage to Donald Adcock, who died in 2011. The two have a daughter, Sylvia.

Adcock is primarily self-taught. She has no degrees, though she attended Texas Tech University, Goddard College, and North Carolina State University. She studied and wrote poetry for more than ten years while working in the business world. After her first book was published, she was awarded a teaching residency at Duke University. Other teaching positions followed, most notably her ongoing position as Writer in Residence at Meredith College, which she held until 2006.

Poetry collections
Adcock's poetry collections include the following:
Walking out: Poems, 1975
Nettles: Poems, 1983
Beholdings: Poems, 1988
The Difficult Wheel: Poems, 1995
Intervale: New and Selected Poems, 2001 (winner of the Poets' Prize and a finalist for the Lenore Marshall Poetry Prize)
Slantwise: Poems, 2008 (Louisiana State University Press L.E. Phillabaum Prize volume for 2008)
Widow Poems, 2014
Rough Fugue, 2017

Awards
Adcock's awards include the following:
State of North Carolina Artist Fellowship in Poetry, 1988
North Carolina Award for Literature, 1996
Texas Institute of Letters Prize, 1996
Sam Ragan Award in Fine Arts, 1998
Guggenheim Fellowship, 2002
Poets' Prize, 2003
Two Pushcart Prizes
National Endowment for the Arts Fellowship in Poetry

See also
Paul Jones (computer technologist)

References

American women poets
Living people
1938 births
People from San Augustine, Texas
21st-century American women